Rear Admiral H. Spencer Matthews Jr. (May 5, 1921 – September 24, 2002) was the first Naval Aviation Pilot to be promoted to flag rank in the Navy.  He graduated number one in his class of 500 aviation cadets.  In operational training he received a commendation for being the first student to complete the celestial navigation course with a perfect grade.  He served five combat tours in the Vietnam War including tours as the deputy commander of U.S. Navy Forces Vietnam and as the Vice Chief of the Vietnamese navy.  He was the president of four small companies and served on the board of directors of two corporations.

Military decorations
 Distinguished Service Medal (v)
 Legion of Merit
 Bronze Star Medal (v)
 Air Medals (12)
 Joint Service Commendation Medal and Navy Commendation Medal
 12 Foreign Medals, including the highest awards given by South Vietnam and Cambodia.

References and notes
 Arlington National Cemetery obituary

1921 births
2002 deaths
United States Navy personnel of the Vietnam War
Burials at Arlington National Cemetery
Naval War College alumni
Recipients of the Navy Distinguished Service Medal
Recipients of the Legion of Merit
United States Navy admirals